Wonkwang University is a university located in Iksan, South Korea. Founded as Youilhakrim (유일학림) in 1946, it is one of the few academies affiliated with Won Buddhism. Yuilhakrim was succeeded by Wonkwang Junior College (원광초급대학) on 5 November 1951, and gained college status on 29 January 1953. The Postgraduate School was opened in 1967, and in 1971 it gained university status.

The university is known for its diverse medical courses: western medicine, dentistry, Korean medicine and pharmacy. Beside medical courses, the school is well known for its specialised courses such as police administration, fire service administration, and law school.

Wonkwang University is one of the two only schools in South Korea that have courses for antiques restoration.

Alumni
 Ha Tae-kwon, badminton player
 Hwang Sun-ho, badminton player
 Kim Dong-moon, badminton player
 Park Beom-shin, author
 Seo Do-young, actor
 Shin Joon-Sup, retired boxer

External links
Wonkwang University

References

Iksan
Private universities and colleges in South Korea
Universities and colleges in North Jeolla Province
Educational institutions established in 1946
Buddhist universities and colleges in South Korea
1946 establishments in Korea

Won Buddhism